David W. Ross (born 15 March 1974) is an English musician and actor. After moving to London at the age of 17 and seeking work as a film extra, his photo was spotted by Ian Levine, a boy band producer, and Ross was signed to A&M Records U.K., as one of the four members of Bad Boys Inc. The group released one self-titled album, which spawned five hit singles, including the Top 10 smash "More to This World".

Ross has gone on to become an actor and screenwriter, based in Los Angeles. He starred in the 2006 Sundance Film Festival breakout hit Quinceañera (Echo Park LA), which won both the Audience Award and Grand Jury Prize. Quinceañera was also selected to play at the 2006 Berlin Film Festival and won the 2007 Independent Spirit John Cassavetes Award. Ross has starred in the award-winning short The Receipt, which won the prize for Best Comedy at the Los Angeles International Short Film Festival, Sneaux, which was nominated for six LA Weekly Theater Awards including Best Musical, and has appeared in many high-profile television and print commercials around the world.

As a screenwriter his first feature film I Do, tackles the controversial issue of gay marriage inequality in America. Ross appeared in the 2003 film 200 American as David Ross, as he did in Quinceañera and The Receipt.

Ross lives in Los Angeles. He discussed being an openly gay actor in the first episode of Stephen Fry's documentary Out There.

References

External links

Official website
A&M Records
Chicago Tribune 30 June 2006
Holden, Stephen. New York Times 4 August 2006
Williams, Andrew. Metro.co.uk, 25 September 2006

1974 births
Bad Boys Inc members
English male film actors
English gay actors
English male singers
English screenwriters
English male screenwriters
Living people
British LGBT singers
English gay musicians